Ann Kirschner is an American entrepreneur, educator, and author of the books Sala's Gift: My Mother's Holocaust Story and Lady at the OK Corral: The True Story of Josephine Marcus Earp. A veteran of four start-ups, Kirschner launched the National Football League's NFL.COM and co-founded Columbia University's interactive knowledge network Fathom.com.  She is Dean Emerita of Macaulay Honors College of the City University of New York (CUNY), a University Professor at the CUNY Graduate Center, and a faculty fellow of the Futures Initiative.  She is the co-founder of the Women In Technology and Entrepreneurship in New York (WiTNY), a collaboration between CUNY and Cornell Tech to increase participation of women in computer science, and a trustee of Princeton University.

Education and early career
Kirschner's eclectic career includes lecturer, author, and media and marketing pioneer in broadcast television, cable, satellite, and interactive media. A Whiting Fellow in the Humanities, she earned a doctorate in English literature from Princeton University, a master's degree from the University of Virginia, and a bachelor of arts degree from the State University of New York at Buffalo.

Kirschner started out as a lecturer on Victorian literature at Princeton University and working as a freelance writer for CBS, The New York Times, and Chronicle of Higher Education. She assisted the director of English programs at Modern Language Association, and Lola Szladits, the director of the Berg Collection at the New York Public Library. Kirschner has conducted research on doctorates in business, funded by grants from Texas Committee for the Humanities, and the Littauer Foundation to study slave labor camps. Kirschner was scholar-in-residence at Rollins College and James Madison University.

Entrepreneurship
Her start-ups include Request Teletext, the first full-channel cable teletext service; PrimeTime 24 - one of the first home satellite broadcast networks; NFL Sunday Ticket and NFL.com - the first sports league on satellite television and the Internet; and Fathom.com, the first interactive knowledge network affiliated to leading universities, libraries, museums, and research institutions. Fathom's consortium includes Columbia University, London School of Economics, New York Public Library, British Library, British Museum, Victoria and Albert Museum, Cambridge University Press, the Science Museum of the University of Chicago, University of Michigan, Woods Hole Oceanographic Institution, and American Film Institute. She introduced new media to the National Football League (NFL) using emerging technologies, such as interactive television and the Internet, and founded NFL.com  and Team NFL on America Online.

Kirschner is president of Comma Communications, a management consulting company focused on strategic assessment and innovation in education, media, and technology.   She co-founded Satellite Broadcast Networks and PrimeTime 24, where she was executive vice president of sales and marketing for both companies. Earlier, she was director of new business development for TelePrompTer/Group W Cable, where she won an ACE award in marketing.

Advisor and Board Director 
She is a current or former board member of Movado Group (MOV), Strategic Cyber Ventures, Apollo Group, Topps, onhealth.com, Public Agenda, Jewish Women's Archive, MOUSE, Paul and Daisy Soros Foundation, Footsteps, World Quant University, New York Media Association, Theatreworks USA, Footsteps, the Princeton University English Department Advisory Council, and the Leadership Council of the Princeton University Graduate School.

Professional recognition
Kirschner has been honored with the Above and Beyond Award (2014) from City and State Magazine, New York Award from New York Magazine (1999),
and as a distinguished alumni of SUNY Buffalo and Princeton University.

Publications

Books
Kirschner is the author of Sala's Gift: My Mother's Holocaust Story, the story of her mother's wartime rescue of hundreds of letters sent to her during the five years she spent in Nazi slave Labor camps. The letters include correspondence between Kirschner's mother and Ala Gertner during the Holocaust. The book has also been published in German as Salas Geheiminis, in Polish, as Listy z Pudełka, in Italian, as Il Dono di Sala, in French, as Le Secret de ma mère, in Czech as Salin Dar, and Chinese (Mandarin).

Her second book, Lady at the OK Corral: the True Story of Josephine Marcus Earp was published by HarperCollins in March 2013. It is a biography of Josephine Marcus Earp, Wyatt Earp's common law wife of nearly 50-years. According to the author, Marcus sparked the world's most famous gunfight, buried her husband in a Jewish cemetery after he died in 1929, and subsequently shaped the legend of Wyatt Earp and the Wild West. In 2013, Kirschner's book was selected as an Editor's Choice by The New York Times Sunday Book Review and Kirschner was honored as best new Western author by True West Magazine.

Selected publications
Are Universities On the Wrong Side of History? Forbes 
Perfume Before Zoom, I Presume, Forward 
Dad, Did Trump Lose Your Vote? Newsweek 
Education is Not Preparing Students for a Fast-Changing World: Boston Globe
Innovations in Higher Education, HAH!  The Chronicle of Higher Education: 
The Chronicle of Higher Education: Adventures in the Land of Wikipedia
The Chronicle of Higher Education: Reading Dickens Four Ways
The Chronicle of Higher Education: My iPad Day
The Baltimore Sun: Study Abroad to Get Ahead in the U.S. (Commentary)

References

External links
 Lady at the OK Corral website
 Ann Kirschner's website
 Ann Kirschner on girlgeeks.org
 Ann Kirschner on The Technology Source
 

Year of birth missing (living people)
Living people
Columbia University faculty
Princeton University alumni
University of Virginia alumni
City University of New York faculty
Philosophers from New York (state)
University at Buffalo alumni